Heyfield is a town in Victoria, Australia, with a population of 1,993. Located on the Thomson River, Heyfield is a gateway to the Victorian High Country.

History
In 1841 an early settler, James McFarlane, described the district as resembling "a field of waving corn", and called it "Hayfield".  By 1866, the spelling had changed to "Heyfield", but exactly when and why this happened is unclear. It may have been renamed to reflect the spelling of the nearby Heyfield Station.

In 1866, McFarlane's property was taken over by James Tyson, a former member of the Queensland Legislative Council, a pastoralist, and considered Australia's first self-made millionaire.

The town grew up as a stopping point for diggers on their way to the Gippsland goldfields, and the Post Office opened on 24 September 1870.

The Heyfield Magistrates' Court closed on 1 January 1983, not having been visited by a Magistrate since 1970.

It is today known for its agriculture and timber production.  It is the principal source of hardwood in Victoria, and the largest timber mill in the Southern Hemisphere, Australian Sustainable Hardwoods, is located there. The district's irrigation water comes from Lake Glenmaggie.

During the Gippsland bushfires in December 2006 and January 2007, the town was used as a staging area by the networked fire agencies, being, the Department of Sustainability and Environment (DSE), Country Fire Authority (CFA), Victoria Police, and the Victorian State Emergency Service (SES).

A skatepark was built in Heyfield in December 2005.

Heyfield and its surroundings were also victims of severe flash floods twice during winter and spring in 2007. The Thomson River burst its banks and rendered the road out of Heyfield impassable.

The town has an Australian Rules football team competing in the North Gippsland Football League.

Golfers play at the course of the Heyfield Golf Club on Golflinks Road.

Cultural notes
The author Mary Grant Bruce started writing her Billabong series of books in 1910 while staying at James Tyson's former house.

The poet Shaw Neilson spent some time in the Heyfield area in the 1920s, where he wrote several poems and helped in the construction of the Lake Glenmaggie weir wall.

Notable people
 Wil Anderson - Australian stand-up comedian and TV and radio personality
 David Wojcinski - Geelong FC Player.
 Leigh Brown - Retired Collingwood FC Player. Melbourne FC assistant coach.
 Brent Macaffer - Collingwood FC Player.

Gallery

References

External links
Heyfield
Sydney Morning Herald - Heyfield

Towns in Victoria (Australia)
Shire of Wellington